Neolitsea is a genus of about 85 species of evergreen shrubs and small trees in the laurel family Lauraceae. They range from Indo-Malaysia to East Asia to Australia. The leaves are alternate, clustered, or verticillate, rarely subopposite. Species are dioecious, with separate male and female plants.

The Australian species, of which there are three, are commonly known as bolly gums and are fairly common in the rainforests of the east.

Many species of Neolitsea have been analysed for essential oils and their biological activity.

Selected species
Neolitsea aciculata - a small tree; Japan, Taiwan
Neolitsea australiensis - Australia, Green bolly gum
Neolitsea cassia - Sri Lanka
Neolitsea cambodiana var. glabra synonym Neolitsea hongkongensis- Hong Kong
Neolitsea chuii -tree up to 18m, South China
Neolitsea daibuensis - a small tree; Taiwan
Neolitsea dealbata - Australia, tree up to 12m, Hairy-leaved bolly gum
Neolitsea fischeri - India
Neolitsea fuscata - Sri Lanka (unresolved name)
Neolitsea kedahense - Malaysia
Neolitsea mollissima - Malaysia
Neolitsea parvigemma - a small tree; Taiwan
Neolitsea sericea - tree up to 15m; Japan, Korea, Taiwan, China
Neolitsea vidalii - the Philippines

References

 
Lauraceae genera
Dioecious plants
Taxa named by George Bentham
Taxa named by Joseph Dalton Hooker